Ngawi Town is the capital of Ngawi Regency which is also the center of government and economy of Ngawi Regency. Ngawi is also a district which is in Ngawi Regency, East Java Province, Indonesia. This sub-district is located 180 km west of Surabaya and 610 km east of Jakarta. Geographically, Ngawi is in the middle of the northern part Ngawi Regency as well as the city part of Ngawi. Infrastructure and settlements from Ngawi Regency are also concentrated in this region.

In 2022 the population in Ngawi will reach 84,923 people with a density of around 1,160 people per square kilometers, almost one-tenth of the total population Ngawi Regency is domiciled in this urban sub-district. Ngawi has an area of 73.22 km2 of which around 48 percent or 34.96 km2 is paddy fields, rivers and plantations, the remainder is in the form of residential land, offices or agencies, shops, industry and other urban infrastructure.

This sub district is directly adjacent to Pitu and Margomulyo Districts, Bojonegoro Regency to the north, Kasreman District and Pangkur District to the east, Geneng District, Kwadungan District and Paron District to the south and especially Paron District to the west.

History

Etymology 

Ngawi comes from the word "AWI", which means bamboo which then gets the nasal letters "Ng" to become "NGAWI". As is the case with names in other areas, there are lots of place (village) names associated with plant names. As Ngawi pointed out, a place around the edge of Solo River and Madiun River is overgrown with bamboo.

Kingdoms 
In the past, Ngawi came from the word awi/bamboo and at the same time indicated Ngawi's location as a district on the banks of the Bengawan Solo and Madiun rivers. Based on research on ancient objects, it shows that in Ngawi there has been a religious activity since the Airlangga government which still lasted until the end of the reign of the Kingdom of Majapahit.

This is reinforced by several inscriptions, one of which is the Cangu Inscription which is a legacy of King Hayamwuruk (Sri Rajasanegara) from Majapahit which has the Saka year 1280 (1358) which states that Ngawi is a private area. The enshrinement fragments show a spiritual nature which is closely related to the worship of Mount Lawu (Girindra), but over time there has been a shift due to the influence of the entry of Religion Islam as well as the culture brought by the Europeans especially the Dutch who long enough dominate the government in Indonesia.

Dutch colonial 

Another relic is in the form of the Van den Bosch fortress. Now it is called Pendem fort because the location of the fort is underground so it is not visible from the outside. As for its location at the confluence corner between the 2 rivers Bengawan Solo and Madiun. Fort van den Bosch was built between 1839 and 1845 by the Dutch East Indies government, at which time Ngawi had an important position in the field of transportation. With quite an important role in the past, so that Ngawi can survive and develop into a subdistrict and even the forerunner of the regencial itself. Besides that, Ngawi has played an important role in traffic since prehistoric times, having an important geostrategic position.

Geography 
Ngawi is located in the middle of Ngawi Regency which is also the Ngawi part of town. The total area of Ngawi district town is 73.22 km. Administratively, this area is divided into 4 urban village and 12 villages, 86 hamlets.

Geographically, Ngawi District town is located at 7°35'–7°48' South Latitude and 111°38'–111°50' East Longitude. Ngawi District is also located and flanked by two major rivers, namely the Solo River and Madiun River rivers which flow directly to the northern part of the Ngawi District.

Borderline 
 Pitu District, Margomulyo Districts to the north (on Bojonegoro Regency)
 Kasreman District, Pangkur District to the east
 Geneng District, Paron District  to the south
 Paron District to the west

Geology 
The geological condition of Ngawi city consists of Alluvium, Litosol, Mergel and Limestone Lands. Based on geological conditions, Ngawi is categorized as an area that is relatively safe from earthquakes because it is located far from the Kendeng fault line which is located in the Randublatung and most of the area Bojonegoro Regency. This area has unstable soil contours or moves during the dry season in the form of hollow soil or cracked soil so that infrastructure development requires geotechnical engineering.

Topography 
Ngawi is located in the center of the northern part of Ngawi Regency. The area is directly adjacent to Kasreman and Pangkur Districts to the east, Kwadungan and Geneng Districts to the south, Paron District in the west and Pitu and Margomulyo Districts in the north. The majority of the Ngawi District area is lowland, namely 72.08% with an altitude between 43 – 57 meters above sea level, while the rest are hilly areas, namely 27.92% which are in the northern Ngawi region, namely Kerek Village, Ngawi Villy, Banyuurip Village and some areas Karangtengah Prandon Village north with an altitude between 57 – 133 meters above sea level. Soil structure in Ngawi consists of alluvial soil, the result of river deposits Solo river and Madiun river, in the north and northeast there are hills which are included in the Kendeng mountain area which contains high levels of lime because the majority of the land in Ngawi to the north and northeast is in the form of less fertile rocky soil. In Ngawi there are two large rivers namely Solo river and Madiun river. The Madiun River is one of the two main rivers that divide parts of the Ngawi region namely Ngawi District to the west and Ngawi District to the east or what is often called the ancient Ngawi region. Paddy fields and plantations are located in the western, southern and eastern regions of the city's Ngawi District while the forest area is in the north of Ngawi which is directly adjacent to Margomulyo.

Climate 
The climate in Ngawi District is a tropical climate, similar to the climate in Ngawi Regency. The temperature, weather, rainfall and humidity in the Ngawi City sub-district are not much different from the climate in Ngawi Regency. But the difference is only a few numbers. Based on Koppen climate classification, Ngawi city sub-district is included in the wet and dry tropical climate category (Aw) with two seasons in a year namely rainy season and dry season. Rainfall in Ngawi averages 163 mm per month and 1,951 mm per year. The highest rainfall above 200 mm occurs from January to March and November to December. The average air temperature in Ngawi ranges from 24.7 °C to 29.8 °C.

Government 
Ngawi is led by a sub-district head who is then assisted by a sub-district secretary or secretariat in carrying out his duties. The current head of the Ngawi city sub-district is Eko Yudo Nurcahyo, who has served since 2021 and is assisted by a sub-district secretary named Indah Puspowati.

Administrative region 
Administratively, the Ngawi District area has 12 villages (desa) and 4 urban village/ward (kelurahan) which are divided into 86 hamlets (dusun) or neighborhoods (lingkungan).
The following is a list of names of villages and sub-districts located in Ngawi District:

Demographics

Religion 

As of June 30, 2022 The majority religion in Ngawi District is Religion Islam whose total adherents reach 97.00% or as many as 82,378 people of the entire population Ngawi sub-district, with a total population of 84,923. In Ngawi there is also the Baiturrahman Grand Mosque which is the largest mosque in the sub-district and even in Ngawi Regency. The mosques in this sub-district of the city are almost evenly distributed to the outskirts of the Ngawi sub-district.

Other religions adhered to by the majority of the population are Christian with 2,463 people (2.90%) where Protestant totaling 1,713 people (2.02%) and Catholic with 750 people (0.88%). The majority of its adherents come from ethnic Chinese and ethnic East Indonesia and a minority of local Javanese. In Ngawi Subdistrict there are also several churches including the St. Yosef Ngawi Catholic Church, the Jawi Wetan Ngawi Christian Church, Pentecostal Church in Indonesia Karang Asri, GBIKA Ngawi and so forth.

Other religions adhered to by residents of Ngawi Subdistrict apart from Islam and Christianity are Buddhism 47 people (0.05%), Hinduism 29 people (0.03%) and the rest is Treat of YME of 6 souls (0.01%).

Language 

The language that is often spoken by the people of Ngawi town is language Indonesia as the official language. Javanese language is the language which is the dominant main language in Ngawi town.

The Mataraman Javanese dialect is a dialect of the Javanese language that is spoken by many people in Ngawi Regency, especially in the Ngawi District area and the former residency areas of Madiun, Kediri and Bojonegoro. The term "Mataraman" refers to a cultural area which includes the west-south part of East Java because of that area was ruled by the Mataram Sultanate in Central Java. This dialect is also spoken by some people in Lamongan, parts of western Malang, parts of western Jombang, and southern parts of Banyuwangi. Based on the results of the 2020 Population Census, the percentage of speakers of the Javanese dialect of Mataramam reaches 34.62% of the total population of East Java as a whole.

The most visible thing about this Javanese dialect is the use of language that still seems subtle compared to other Javanese dialects. In addition, the Mataraman Javanese dialect has differences in intonation with standard Javanese because it often puts stress on the first syllable, for example "Byuh-byuh, uayuné cah iki" ("Wow, this child is beautiful").

The language in the Ngawi city area is not only Javanese, but consists of various languages ​​in Indonesia including Sundanese language, Madura language, Osing language dan Tengger language. The Surabaya Javanese language and the Arekan dialect also have speakers in this sub-district for those who migrate or immigrants who live in the Ngawi sub-district of the city.

Culture 

The original inhabitants or tribes who inhabit Ngawi Regency are Javanese, as well as in the Ngawi sub-district. However, residents from other tribes also live in this sub-district.
The Chinese in Ngawi Sub-district were immigrants who came from China who came to Ngawi in the pre-independence era of Indonesia. The average settlement of ethnic Chinese people in Ngawi is in the Chinatown village, more precisely in the neighborhood or hamlet of Sidomulyo, Ketangi Ward. The majority of people of Chinese descent in Ngawi work in services, services (including shops) and industry. This sub-district is also the domicile center for all ethnic Chinese people in the Ngawi Regency area. considering the capacity of this sub-district as the capital and economic center of Ngawi Regency. Other ethnic groups in Ngawi Sub-District besides the dominant Javanese who live in this sub-district include the Madurese, Osing, Bawean, Tenggerese, Banjar, Samin, Balinese, Sundanese, Aceh, Malays, Dayak, Minahasa, Bugis, Ambon, Batak, Minangkabau, Betawi and some foreigners who are also people of Arab descent and Europeans.

The Javanese are the majority ethnic group or those who dominate the population of the Ngawi sub-district of the city, apart from the Madurese, Tengger, Osing, Sundanese, or tribes outside Java. As with most other Indonesian ethnic groups, the Sundanese are one of them. The Javanese people are part of the Austronesian people whose ancestors are thought to have come from the plains of Taiwan or southern China and migrated via Philippines and Sulawesi first to reach the island of Java between the 15th century BC to the 10th century BC.

Javanese Culture is a culture that originates from Java and is embraced by the Javanese people, especially in North Banten, North West Java, Central Java, Yogyakarta, and including the East Java region. Javanese culture can be broadly divided into 3, namely the Javanese Kulonan culture (North Banten-North West Java-West Central Java), culture of Central Java (East)-(Yogyakarta), and East Java culture. Javanese culture prioritizes justice, balance, harmony and harmony in everyday life. Javanese culture upholds ethics and social simplicity. Javanese culture besides being found in North Banten, West Java North, Central Java, Yogyakarta, and East Java it is also found in the areas where the Javanese are overseas, namely in Jakarta, Sumatra, and up to the South American continent, namely Suriname. Even Javanese culture itself is one of the Indonesian cultures that are in great demand by foreign countries including Wayang kulit, Keris, Batik, Kebaya, and Gamelan.

Traditional dances 
Orek-Orek is one of the traditional Indonesian dances originating from the Ngawi Regency, especially in the Ngawi District. This dance was popular in 1980, this type of dance is usually performed when an event or celebration is held and in almost every event the Orek-Orek Dance contains dynamic movements and is carried out by a pair of young people numbering four to ten people and you need to know that the art of Orek-Orek has existed since the Dutch colonial era before Indonesian independence.

During the Dutch colonial era, the Dutch said that their celebrations looked messy maybe this is because the workers come from various regions, so that their dance has its own uniqueness - each and every word "morak-marik" or "urak-arik" then many people call it "orek-orek".

This orek-orek dance depicts the excitement of the young people after doing the "Rodi" work ordered by the Dutch Government at that time the Ngawi Youth were forced to build a trans Java road from Ayer to Panarukan not only the Ngawi Youth were forced to do forced labor, but also many young people from other areas, after work they perform various performances, such as playing Ketoprak, Ludruk and they danced this dance together as entertainment to unwind after work.

Infrastructure 
Ngawi city also has a number of infrastructures, starting from the outer ring road, toll roads and green open spaces built in urban areas.
The Government of Ngawi Regency, especially the PUPR Service, built the southern ring road in 1997 to reduce the number of large vehicles passing in the city which can lead to traffic jams and damaged roads There is a plan to build a northern ring road that passes outside the city, namely Pitu District and Kasreman District to build the economy of residents around the District of Ngawi in the north. Ngawi-Kertosono and Solo-Ngawi toll roads also have toll gates within the city. The purpose of building a toll gate in the Ngawi sub-district of the city is to be able to drive the economy of the people of Ngawi Regency, especially the Ngawi sub-district.

There are also green open parks created in urban areas to serve as tourist attractions for local residents and residents outside the city. Construction of multi-storey buildings began to spread in this area, one of which is the construction of hotels and shopping centers. To accommodate the needs of pedestrians and tourists, the Ngawi Regency government, especially the Ngawi District, built bicycle paths on a number of main roads in Ngawi, as well as pedestrian paths that are almost evenly distributed throughout the Ngawi region.

Transportation

Highway 
Ngawi passed by Indonesian National Route 17 and Indonesian National Route 20. The highway intersection is located right in the city of Ngawi, namely at the Kartonyono intersection and the Karangasri intersection, so that in its development, the City of Ngawi is always crowded with various vehicles. Not only that, there are also roads between districts that are connected to each other. Inter-district roads in question are:

 Ngawi–Pitu Highway
 Ngawi–Paron Highway
 Ngawi–Jogorogo Highway
 Ngawi–Pangkur Highway
 Ngawi–Kwadungan Highway

Passenger 

Even though the City of Ngawi is not crossed by a railway line for the southern route of Java, Ngawi also has a bus station which is also used as a boarding and alighting point for passengers who will be traveling to and from Ngawi town District. The Kertonegoro bus station is also the only terminal in the Ngawi City area, so that with supporting facilities such as this terminal, passengers do not have to struggle to find the bus to board. The modes of public transportation available at the Kertonegoro bus station include:

 City transport
 Village transport
 Medium bus(Routes within the Ngawi Regency/Routes within the East Java Province)
 Big bus(Routes within the East Java/Cross-city routes across provinces)

Other public transportation 
In-city transportation in the Ngawi Subdistrict of the city is also served by online taxis (Grab Car and Go Car), conventional taxis, online taxis Grab and Go Ride, rickshaws, motorbike rickshaws as well as several car rental services available in the subdistrict area of ​​this city as another option for traveling around the city of Ngawi.

Toll road 

The city of Ngawi is also an area crossed by the Trans Java Toll Road, the toll road that connects Jakarta and Surabaya. And enter the Solo-Kertosono Toll Road. The details of the distribution are that on the west side there is the Solo–Ngawi Toll Road, while on the east side there is the Ngawi–Kertosono Toll Road, which is parallel to the southern Java railroad. The Ngawi Toll Gates is the only access for vehicles going to/from Ngawi City.

Sports 
Sports that are developing in Ngawi City include football, basketball, badminton, tennis, volleyball, swimming, and so on. Ngawi has a stadium, the Ketonggo Stadium. Ngawi also has a sports hall or abbreviated (GOR) even though it is located outside the Ngawi District of the city area, including the Klithic village area, Geneng District. however, almost all sports activities in the Ngawi area of ​​the city are centered in the building.

Health 

The city of Ngawi has hospitals managed by various parties, both the local government and the private sector. Hospitals in Ngawi Regency are also concentrated in the Ngawi District of this city. There are two Community Health Centers (Puskesmas) in Ngawi, namely the Ngawi Health Center and the Ngawi Ancient Health Center. There are also three supporting health centers (Pustu) in the Ngawi City area, the authority of which is under the two Puskesmas in Ngawi City. At several points in Ngawi City there are also several herbal and traditional medicine clinics for treatment with natural ingredients.

Hospitals 
The following are the names of hospitals in Ngawi:
Dr Soeroto Hospital
Widodo Hospital
At-Tin Husada Islamic Hospital

Education

Elementary schools 
In general, the education sector in Ngawi City is still dominated by public schools, especially at the elementary level. Public elementary school are spread across all sub-districts and villages through the president instruction elementary school (SD Inpres) program, but among these public schools there are a few private elementary school. The total number of public and private primary schools in Ngawi City reaches thirty-six buildings.Meanwhile, there are eight school buildings in total for Islamic elementary school in Ngawi District of the city.The following are the names of elementary schools in Ngawi town District:

 Banyuurip Public Elementary School
 Beran 4 Public Elementary School
 Beran 5 Public Elementary School
 Beran 6 Public Elementary School
 Grudo 3 Public Elementary School
 Grudo 4 Public Elementary School
 Jururejo 2 Public Elementary School
 Kandangan 1 Public Elementary School
 Kandangan 3 Public Elementary School
 Karang Asri 1 Public Elementary School
 Karang Asri 3 Public Elementary School
 Karangtengah Town 1 Public Elementary School
 Karangtengah Town 4 Public Elementary School
 Karangtengah Prandon 1 Public Elementary School
 Karangtengah Prandon 2 Public Elementary School
 Kartoharjo 3 Public Elementary School
 Kerek Public Elementary School
 Ketanggi 2 Public Elementary School
 Mangunharjo 1 Public Elementary School
 Mangunharjo 2 Public Elementary School
 Mangunharjo 3 Public Elementary School
 Mangunharjo 4 Public Elementary School
 Margomulyo 1 Public Elementary School
 Margomulyo 2 Public Elementary School
 Ngawi 1 Public Elementary School
 Ngawi 2 Public Elementary School
 Pelem 1 Public Elementary School
 Pelem 2 Public Elementary School
 Watualang 1 Public Elementary School
 Watualang 2 Public Elementary School
 Watualang 3 Public Elementary School
 Saint Joseph Chatolic Elementary School
 Muhammadiyah 1 Elementary School 
 Islam Al Qolam Elementary School
 Luqman Al-Hakim Elementary School
 Harapan Ummat Elementary School (SDIT)

And here are some names of Islamic elementary school (Madrasa) in the Ngawi district of the city:

 Tahfidz Madinatul Huffadz elementary school
 Ngawi 6 Islamic elementary school
 Al Falah Beran Islamic elementary school
 Al Hijrah 1 Islamic elementary school
 An Noor Karang Asri Islamic elementary school
 Budi Mulia Islamic elementary school
 PSM Watualang Islamic elementary school
 Muhammadiyah Kartoharjo Islamic elementary school

Junior high schools 
Meanwhile, public junior high schools in Ngawi town District are dominated by private schools, with a total of eight school buildings. However, the number of public junior high schools in Ngawi City is almost even, with six public schools. Apart from that there are also two Islamic junior high school in the Ngawi District of the city.Following are some names of junior high schools in the Ngawi City area:

 Ngawi 1 Public Junior High School
 Ngawi 2 Public Junior High School
 Ngawi 3 Public Junior High School
 Ngawi 4 Public Junior High School
 Ngawi 5 Public Junior High School
 Ngawi 6 Public Junior High School
 Luqman Al-Hakim Junior High School
 Ma'arif Junior High School
 Ngawi 5 Muhammadiyah Junior High School
 Syafaatul Ulum Junior High School
 TahFizh Al Qolam Junior High School
 Wahidiyah Junior High School
 Islam Al-Hijrah Junior High School
 Harapan Ummat Junior High School

Islamic Junior High School (Madrasa) in the Ngawi district of the city:

 Ngawi 3 Public Islamic Junior High School
 PSA An-Noor Islamic Junior High School

Senior high schools/vocational high schools 

The only senior high school in the Ngawi City area is Ngawi 1 Public Senior High School (SMA Negeri 1 Ngawi), while Ngawi 2 Public Senior High School (SMA Negeri 2 Ngawi), although it uses the name Ngawi town District, is located in Geneng District. Senior High Schools in Ngawi City are dominated by private schools, with up to three buildings. The total number of public and private high schools in Ngawi City is four buildings. There are twice as many Vocational Schools in Ngawi City as Senior High Schools. The number of Honesty Middle School buildings in Ngawi City reaches eight buildings, consisting of two state schools namely Ngawi 1 Vocational High School (SMKN 1 Ngawi), Ngawi 2 Vocational High School (SMKN 2 Ngawi) and six private schools. Apart from that, there are also two Islamic senior high school in the Ngawi sub-district of the city.The following is a list of high school names and vocational in Ngawi City:

 Ngawi 1 Public Senior High School
 Karya Pembangunan Senior High School
 Ma'arif Senior High School
 Muhammadiyah 1 Ngawi Senior High School
 Ngawi 1 Public Vocational High School
 Ngawi 2 Public Vocational High School
 PGRI 1 Vocational High School
 Modern Vocational High School
 10 November Vocational High School
 Muhammadiyah 1 Ngawi Vocational High School
 Rahani Husada Health Vocational High School
 Trisakti Vocational High School

Islamic Senior High School (Madrasa) in the Ngawi district of the city:

 Ngawi 1 Public Islamic Senior High School
 Al-Hijrah Islamic Senior High School

College 
Most students in the Ngawi City area continue their tertiary education outside the city such as Surabaya, Yogyakarta, Surakarta, Semarang, Jakarta, Bandung, Malang and Bogor. This student from Ngawi Regency is a member of the FORSMAWI INDONESIA organization. Who has activities in the field of education and social. Even so, there are also universities in Ngawi. There are only a few tertiary schools in Ngawi, only five campus. Among them are the:

 Soerjo University
 Open University
 Modern College of Teacher Training and Education (STKIP Modern)
 Nursing Academy (Akper) and
 Islamic Religious Institute (STAI Ngawi) which has now changed its name to (IAI Ngawi).

Economy

Modern markets 
Ngawi also has shopping centers ranging from modern shopping centers (malls/supermarkets), wholesale centers, and traditional ones. Ngawi has two modern shopping centers namely Luwes and Tiara Supermarket. Alfamart, Alfamidi and Indomaret are also mushrooming in the Ngawi area, almost every place in Ngawi has this minimarket.

Traditional and animal markets 
In addition, Ngawi also has several traditional markets and animal markets, namely the Ngawi Big Market, Beran Market, Grudo Market, Krempyeng (Watualang) Market, Brangetan Market or ancient Ngawi. There are two animal markets in the Ngawi city area, namely the Legi animal market and a flea market located in Kandangan Village and the Koplakan Chicken Market in the Karangtengah Town ward.

Industrial areas 
Residents in the Ngawi city, some also work in the services, industry and trade sectors. Ngawi is the center of trade and business in Ngawi Regency which is experiencing rapid development. Large and medium industries include: Dwi Prima Sentosa, Wilmar group, Shou Lang Lastindo, Surya Bambu Timur industrial, etc.

Tourism

Fort Van den Bosch 

Fort van den Bosch located in Pelem ward, northeastern part of the city, near the mouths of the Solo River and Madiun River, built by the Dutch government in 1839–1845 by Johannes van den Bosch.

The location of the fort is strategic because it is near the mouth of the Madiun River which empties into the Solo River. This fort was deliberately made lower than the surrounding land surrounded by high ground so that it looks hidden from the outside.

The location of Fort Van Den Bosch was deliberately made low from the higher surrounding land so that it was hidden and fulfilled the ideal elements for a defensive fortress. However, with the greatness of the Dutch architect at that time in designing the drainage channels, even though the position was lower than the surrounding land, the location of the fort was able to avoid flooding. Therefore, the Van Den Bosch Fort is also known as the pendem fort by a number of people in Ngawi because of its hidden location.

Ngawioboro Street 

Ngawioboro Street is part of a pedestrian walkway from the Ivory Monumen Kartonyono intersection in the south to Ngawi Regency Square in the north. Ngawioboro Street adopts the style of Malioboro Street which is located in the city of Yogyakarta, with wide pedestrian paths. The location of Ngawioboro Street is along Yos Sudarso Street on the west side.

The government changed the face of the sidewalks along Yos Sudarso street which used to be just an ordinary protocol road but were changed in such a way as to form a city pedestrian area. Now many local residents call it "Ngawioboro Street" or "the Malioboro" of Ngawi city.

Candi Park 

The temple park is a tourist and play park located near the dead river or the indentation of the Madiun River which has the form of a small lake. This park is located in Ketanggi Hamlets, Kartoharjo Village, Ngawi town District.

The view that can be seen from the entrance to the park is the Dead River or the Madiun River basin. The Candi garden is on the banks of the Madiun Bengawan which is no longer the main stream so the water looks calm. The river in the Temple Park area is the result of the normalization of the Madiun River watershed which was carried out in 1971.

Inside the dead river there are also fresh water fish which are the main entertainment for tourists provided for fishing spots. However, visitors are only allowed to catch fish by fishing. The regulation is based on Regional Regulation of Ngawi Regency No. 15 of 2016 concerning Green Open Spaces and Regional Regulation of Ngawi Regency No. 1 of 2017 on Convenience and Public order. Apart from that, there is also a boat, namely a duck boat that tourists can rent to get around in the Kali Mati area of ​​the candi garden.

Even though this location is named Candi Park, it does not mean that there is a temple in the park. Candi is the name of the hamlet where the park is located, namely Candi Hamlet, Kartoharjo Village. In the garden there are various ornamental plants and trees. The park road has been repaired so that it can make it comfortable for tourists who are walking around in the park.

Dungus Park 

Dungus Park is a green open park where there is a statue of a farmer with two buffaloes 7 meters high in the middle of the park and surrounded by a fountain. The statue has the meaning of Ngawi, as one of the rice granaries in East Java where the people are predominantly farmers.

This tourist park has a high philosophy in the eastern part of Ngawi City. The location is quite close to the Kartonyono gold ivory monument, the crossroads of the Ngawi City axis. From the Tugu Kartonyono location, head east for about 1 km. On the front there is the inscription Taman Dungus which corresponds to the name of the administrative location, namely in Dungus Hamlet, Karang Asri Village. Dungus Park is not far from the banks of the Madiun River, which is about 150 meters to the northeast.

The area was once a barren field, only grass adorned the garden. Not infrequently the residents' livestock were seen in this field before, such as cows, goats, buffalo and sheep. Now this park is a destination for tourists and travelers. This new tourist destination in Ngawi, which is one kilometer from the city center, was inaugurated on December 7, 2019 by the Regent of Ngawi.

Kepatihan Ngawi Build 

The old kepatihan itself is an old building located in the District of Ngawi town. Precisely on Patiunus street, Ketangi Village, Ngawi District. This building has a great history for the district or even for Ngawi Regency. The reason is that this building used to be the governor's office that once existed in the Ngawi region. Even the hero HOS Cokroaminoto, a Javanese king without a crown, once worked here as a clerk. He left because he saw the Dutch's injustice to the natives. Until now this building has undergone renovations so that it becomes one of the Tourist Attractions in the Ngawi town District area.

Kepatihan Ngawi is one of the cultural attractions in Ngawi which is located in the ex-Kepatihan on Jalan Patiunus, Ketangi Urban village, Ngawi District, Ngawi. This building includes the legacy of Patih Pringgokusumo, an important figure in the history of the Duchy of Ngawi. The Joglo house and 2 hectares of land belong to the Ngawi regional government which it is hoped will become one of the heritage areas in Indonesia. This kepatihan includes buildings from the past that have high historical value in defending Ngawi during the Dutch colonial period.

Bukit Kerek Indah 
Ngawi sub-district of the city also has other tourist rides. One of them is Kerek Bukit Indah which is located in the Napel hamlet area, Kerek Village. Although the location of this attraction is on the outskirts of the city near the border, but this tour can also be a reference or natural tourist destination in the Ngawi sub-district of the city.

The tourist bridge on Bukit Kerek Indah Ngawi, precisely in Napel hamlet, Kerek village, Ngawi District, there is a tourist destination built by local residents. This started when a group of villagers wanted to develop the tourism sector in their area.

The bridge with a height of 20 meters above the Kendeng Mountains was built independently by residents of Napel Hamlet, Kerek Village. The bridge building was built using bamboo and has a concrete foundation, This bridge has become a tourist destination for tourists from within the country to foreign tourists. On average, tourists come just to enjoy the view of the sky of the city of Ngawi from a high hill.

Ngawi Square 

Ngawi Square is an alun-alun (an area of common, lawn land) with an area of 68,310 square meters. It has several sporting facilities.

Design of Ngawi Square resembling a symmetrical axis is a Javanese order concept, among others, Catur Gatra is the regency seat of Ngawi Regency, Correctional Institution or abbreviated (Lapas), Grand Mosque, the Regional People's Representative Council building, Makodim and other district agencies and the Alun-alun are adjacent to each other and surround the quadrilateral of the Alun-alun.

Cuisine 

The city of Ngawi has a variety of culinary delights, from food to drinks.

Tepo tofu was first made by Mr. Palio. This food is made of rice cake, fried tofu, peanuts, bean sprouts, chili as a spicy taste, melted sweet soy sauce and fried chicken eggs, sprinkled with a topping of fried onions on top.

Cemue is a typical Ngawi hot drink (wedang) made of sliced bread, roasted peanuts, coconut milk, ginger juice and fried onion topping.

Pecel rice native to Ngawi which tastes different from pecel rice from other regions, pecel sauce that is not finely ground like pecel sauce outside of Ngawi. This type of chili certainly has a unique taste.

Gethuk lindri is one of the specialties of Ngawi, the taste of gethuk in Ngawi is different from gethuk in other regions, these traditional snacks are widely available and sold in traditional markets. This snack is made from cassava, grated coconut, vanilla, food coloring and granulated sugar which is printed using a grinding machine.

Tempeh chips which are now "a typical Ngawi food icon". Tempeh chips are generally produced in the Ngawi region, the eastern city, especially in the Sadang Hamlet, Ngawi Village and Karangtengah Prandon Village. All other culinary specialties of the City of Ngawi can be found at the nearest stalls, restaurants, traveling vendors and at a number of angkringan in the city of Ngawi. This snack is made from the main ingredient of thinly sliced tempeh and covered with rice flour dough that has been seasoned.

Sticky rice crust (intip ketan) is unique to the Ngawi sub-district of the city. This is made of sticky rice or glutinous rice which is burnt or hardened on the outer layer to form a peep in Javanese which means the rice hardens or dries at the bottom of the pot. The way to make it is fairly easy, namely by preparing ingredients in the form of glutinous rice, grated coconut, sugar, salt and coconut milk.

See also 

 Java
 Indonesia
 List of regencies and cities of Indonesia

References

Citations

Bibliography 
 Profile and Government Structure of Ngawi District

External links 

 
 BPS Ngawi (town)

Ngawi (town)
Ngawi Regency
Districts of Ngawi Regency